The 1986 Ginebra San Miguel season was the eighth season of the franchise in the Philippine Basketball Association (PBA).

Transactions

Trade

1st finals stint under Big J (Rivalry with Tanduay)
On August 21, Ginebra clinched one of the two finals berth in the All-Filipino Conference with a 91-83 win over Shell Helix. This marks the fourth time the La Toñdena ballclub is playing in the championship series and the first since Robert Jaworski became player-coach of the team in 1985. Ginebra San Miguel were going up against Tanduay Rhum Makers in the finals, who were seeking their second straight title.

A bitter rivalry since the Crispa-Toyota days was born during the All-Filipino championship. Former Toyota teammates Ramon Fernandez and Robert Jaworski played on opposite sides in the finals for the first time. Adding color to their rivalry was Tanduay coach Arturo Valenzona, who steered Ginebra (then Gilbey's Gin) to three trips in the finals from 1982 to 1984 - the same coach Jaworski replaced on the Ginebra bench. 

After taking the series opener of the best-of-five title series, Ginebra lost three straight to the Rhum Makers, which clinch their second championship of the season with a hairline 93-92 win in Game four.

The super import duo
In the Open (Third) Conference, Billy Ray Bates - known as "The Black Superman" - who led the famed Crispa Redmanizers to a grandslam in 1983, teamed up with last year's Ginebra reinforcement and best import Michael Hackett in an explosive combination that have captured the excitement of PBA fans from the moment it made headlines. 

In their highly anticipated first game for Ginebra on September 25 as Bates and Hackett went up against Alaska's Norman Black and Donnie Ray Koonce - similarly comebacking imports - Ginebra won, 122-115. Bates scored 46 points while Hackett had 38.

Championship
After eight years since joining the league in 1979, the La Tondeña ballclub won their first PBA championship by winning the Open Conference crown over Manila Beer, four games to one. On the memorable night of December 11, 1986, Ginebra San Miguel clinched the trophy with a 130-120 victory in Game Five. The Living Legend Robert Jaworski became the first playing coach to steer a team to a PBA title.

Occurrences
League pioneer Francis Arnaiz retired from active playing after seeing action only in the first round of eliminations of the Open Conference.

Awards
Dondon Ampalayo was named the season's Rookie of the Year.
Robert Jaworski made it to the Mythical team's first five selection.

Roster

Imports

References

Barangay Ginebra San Miguel seasons
Ginebra